Sirystes is a genus of birds in the tyrant flycatcher family, Tyrannidae.  They used to be all considered conspecific.  Vocal differences primarily separated the superspecies into four distinct taxa.

The genus contains four species:
 Sibilant sirystes, Sirystes sibilator
 Western sirystes, Sirystes albogriseus
 White-rumped sirystes, Sirystes albocinereus
 Todd's sirystes, Sirystes subcanescens

References

Further reading

External links

 
Bird genera